The Gallaudet Bison football team represents Gallaudet University in National Collegiate Athletic Association (NCAA) Division III competition. It has been discontinued many times, and most recently restarted in 2007. After an undefeated season in 2005, which was achieved after 122 years, head coach Ed Hottle began his campaign to return Gallaudet to the NCAA ranks. With support from the Gallaudet administration, the Bison played their last season of club football in 2006 and played a full NCAA slate of eight games in 2007. In the fall of 2013, Gallaudet's football program began a remarkable run for the Division III playoffs and garnering a considerable amount of publicity, winning the regular season with a 9–1 record, before falling to Hobart College in the first round of the playoffs and ending the season with a 9-2 (.818) overall record.

After the 2009 football season, Coach Hottle left to become the first head coach of the first football team at Stevenson University. He announced his decision in a heart-felt meeting with the football team. Offensive Coordinator Chuck Goldstein was tapped to be the interim head coach of the football team. On December 17, 2009, the interim tag was removed and he is now the permanent head coach of the team.

Gallaudet University's football team has a longstanding rivalry with Catholic University of America, another school in the Washington D.C. area. On September 7, 2012, Gallaudet University defeated Catholic University of America for the first time in the 106-year history of the rivalry between the two D.C. schools.

The home stadium, Hotchkiss Field, was known as Garlic Field prior to 1924.

History
The football team was organized in 1883 by coach John B. Hotchkiss. In the 1890s, the football huddle originated at Gallaudet. Quarterback Paul D. Hubbard noticed hand signals could be read by opposing players, a particular concern when Gallaudet played other schools for the deaf. To remedy this, he had his players form a circle so that his sign-language signals could be sent and received without anyone on the sidelines or on the opposing team seeing.

Postseason results

Hall of Fame
The following football players have been inducted into the Gallaudet Athletics Hall of Fame.
George Andree
Lou Byouk
Richard Caswell
Albert Couthen
Scott Cuscaden
Dewey Deer
Race Drake
Louis Dyer
Bernie Fairwood
Edward Foltz
Charles Hammack
 Paul D. Hubbard
Frederick Hughes
John Jacobs
Richard Jacobs
John Kaleta
Ernest Langenberg
James Macfadden
Charles Marshall
Bilbo Monaghan
Frederick Moore
Bill Ramborger
John Ringle
Lester Rosson
James Segala
Vincent Silvestri
Shannon Simon
Frank Turk
Robert Westermann
Franklin Willis
Darnell Woods
John Wurdemann

References

 
American football teams established in 1883
1883 establishments in Washington, D.C.